Epia may refer to:
 Aipeia, a town in Messenia, Greece
 EPIA, a PC platform from VIA Technologies
 European Photovoltaic Industry Association
 Epia (moth)